National Highway 311, commonly referred to as NH 311 is a national highway in India. It is a spur road of National Highway 11.  NH-311 runs in the state of Rajasthan in India.

Route 
NH311 connects Singhana, Khetri Nagar, Jasrapur, Nangli Saledisingh, Bhatiwar, Chhawasari and Titanwara in the state of Rajasthan.

Junctions  
 
  Terminal near Singhana.

See also 
 List of National Highways in India
 List of National Highways in India by state

References

External links 

 NH 311 on OpenStreetMap

National highways in India
National Highways in Rajasthan